Sunfleet is a station-based car-sharing company that provides services to rent and share cars in Sweden.

Creation and ownership 
It was founded in 1998 as a collaboration between Volvo and Hertz but it is today wholly owned by Volvo Cars.

Plans 
As of 2017, it operates in more than 50 cities in Sweden and has 50,000 users using 1,200 Volvo cars. There are plans to expand the company to operate globally.

References

External links 
  

Transport companies of Sweden
Carsharing